An enterocele is a protrusion of the small intestines and peritoneum into the vaginal canal. 
It may be treated transvaginally or by laparoscopy.

An enterocele may also obstruct the rectum, leading to symptoms of obstructed defecation. Enteroceles can form after treatment for gynecological cancers.

See also

Dolichodouglas

References

External links 

Noninflammatory disorders of female genital tract
Women's health